Dromopoda is a subclass of the arachnids, including the Opiliones (harvestmen), Scorpions, Pseudoscorpions and Solifugae ("camel spiders"). The latter three are sometimes grouped as Novogenuata. Combined morphological and molecular analyses have shown Dromopoda to be monophyletic. However, a strictly molecular analysis did not support the monophyly of Dromopoda.

References

Arachnid taxonomy
Arthropod subclasses